Maria Manuela Conceição Carvalho Margarido (1925 Roça Olímpia, Príncipe Island - March 10, 2007 in Lisbon) was a São Tomé and Príncipe (or Santomean) poet.

Biography
She was born in 1925 to a judge David Guedes de Carvalho, a Portuguese Jew from Porto and a mother of Goa Portuguese, and Angolan origin. She attended a Franciscan school at Valença and later studied at Colégio do Sagrado Coração de Maria in Lisbon.

Manuela Margarido embraced the cause for the fight against colonialism, even in the 1950s, the affirmed the independence of the archipelago. In 1953, she rose her voice against the Batepá massacre perpetrated by Portuguese colonialism. Margarido regularly visited Casa dos Estudantes do Império, the Imperial House of Students, a facility that became the center of liberation movements in the Portuguese colonies of Africa. There, she met Alfredo Margarido, Edmundo Bettencourt, Cândido da Costa Pinto and Manuel de Castro.

She denounced in poetry and against colonial oppression and the misery that Santomeans lived and worked in coffee and cocoa plantations.

She studied religious studies, sociology, ethnology and film at École Pratique de Hautes Études (Practical School of High Studies) and at Sorbonne in Paris where she was exiled. She was later a librarian and secretary there.

After the Carnation Revolution in Portugal in April 1974 where the Estado Novo fascist regime ended, she returned to São Tomé and Príncipe where she was later ambassador of her country in Brussels and took part in different international organizations. She also worked in the theatre and work for the Portuguese review "Estudos Ultramarinos" ("Overseas Studies")

In Lisbon, where she later lived, Margarido took part in the dissemination of her country's culture, having considered by Alda Espírito Santo, Caetano da Costa Alegre and Francisco José Tenreiro, one of the greatest names in Santomean poetry.

In other works, she was consecutive council member of the Atalaia review, of the Interdisciplinary Science, Technolocy and Society Centre at the University of Lisbon (Centro Interdisciplinar de Ciência, Tecnologia e Sociedade da Universidade de Lisboa (CICTSUL)).

She later died in the former imperial capital of Lisbon that she fought at the age of 83 at Hospital São Francisco Xavier, where she was hospitalized.  Her funeral took place at the headquarters of the Grande Oriente Lusitano.

Works
Her greatest work was Alto como o silêncio, published in 1957.

References

Further reading
Inocência Mata: Manuela Margarido: uma poetisa lírica entre o cânone e a margem (Manuela Margarido: A Lyric Poetess in Canon and Edge); SCRIPTA, Belo Horizonte, v. 8, n. 15, p. 240–252, 2. 2004

External links
Memory from the island of Príncipe , (Principean Creole)

1925 births
2007 deaths
São Tomé and Príncipe poets
São Tomé and Príncipe women poets
People from Príncipe
Ambassadors of São Tomé and Príncipe
20th-century poets
20th-century women writers